Beatriz Ortiz Muñoz (born 21 June 1995) is a Spanish female water polo player who competed at the 2016 Summer Olympics representing Spain national water polo team.

In 2018 she won the gold medal at the Mediterranean Games and the bronze at the European Water Polo Championship

See also
 List of World Aquatics Championships medalists in water polo

Notes

References

External links
 
 
 

1995 births
Living people
Spanish female water polo players
Place of birth missing (living people)
Water polo players at the 2016 Summer Olympics
Water polo players at the 2020 Summer Olympics
World Aquatics Championships medalists in water polo
Mediterranean Games gold medalists for Spain
Mediterranean Games medalists in water polo
Competitors at the 2018 Mediterranean Games
Medalists at the 2020 Summer Olympics
Olympic silver medalists for Spain in water polo
Sportspeople from Terrassa
21st-century Spanish women
Water polo players from Catalonia
Sportswomen from Catalonia